Strong with Spirit is a 1967 Soviet spy film directed by Viktor Georgiyev based on a screenplay by Anatoli Grebnev and Aleksandr Lukin. It tells the story of the Soviet intelligence officer Nikolai Kuznetsov. The picture was the 26th most attended domestic film in the Soviet Union.

Plot
The film is about the Soviet intelligence officer Nikolai Ivanovich Kuznetsov.

Cast
 Gunārs Cilinskis as Nikolai Kuznetsov / Paul Zibert (dubbed by Aleksandr Belyavsky)
 Ivan Pereverzev as Dmitry Medvedev
 Yevgeni Vesnik as Voronchuk, agent
 Lyusyena Ovchinnikova as Galya
 Yuri Solomin as Mayor Gettel
 Vija Artmane as Lidia Lisovskaya
 Victoria Fyodorova as Valentina Dovger
 Aleksandr Galevsky as Prikhodko
 Yuri Bogolyubov as Belotinsky
 Yuri Volkov as Ortel
 Daniil Netrebin as mayor
 Paul Butkevich as Kaminsky
 Andrei Fajt as count Gran
 Pyotr Sobolevsky as hauptmann
 Anatoli Romashin as ober-lieutenant (dubbed by Oleg Golubitsky)

References

External links
 

World War II spy films
Films based on Russian novels
1960s Russian-language films
1967 adventure films
Russian biographical films
Soviet biographical films
1960s biographical films
Russian adventure films
Soviet adventure films
Soviet World War II films
Russian World War II films